"Don't Waste My Time" is a song by American singer-songwriter Usher featuring British singer-songwriter Ella Mai. The song was first uploaded to SoundCloud on November 19, 2019, although it was officially released by RCA Records on December 13, 2019 to online music stores and streaming services. It serves as the lead single from Usher's upcoming ninth studio album Confessions 2. The song was written by the artists alongside Vedo, Christopher Allen Jones, and producers Jermaine Dupri and Bryan Michael-Cox. The song takes inspiration in part from "I Like the Way (The Kissing Game)" (1990) by American R&B quintet Hi-Five and "Show You the Way to Go" (1976) by American family group the Jacksons.

Background and release 
Usher has been in the studio working on the sequel to Confessions. In March 2019, he posted a picture of himself in the studio next to a whiteboard with the words "Confessions 2" and a blurred out tracklisting. The following day Jermaine Dupri, who produced the original Confessions went live on Instagram and previewed new music. This is following his last collaborative album A, with Zaytoven. YouKnowIGotSoul exclusively premiere 'Don't Waste My Time" through SoundCloud. It was released for digital download on iTunes, Amazon, Google Play and online streaming services, Tidal, Apple Music, Spotify, and YouTube on December 13, 2019.

Music video 
The music video for "Don't Waste My Time" was directed by LeSean Harris. It was released on March 25, 2020. It features cameos from Snoop Dogg, Jamie Kennedy, Eric Bellinger, Jermaine Dupri, Evan Ross, Christian Combs, and Justin Combs As of April 2021 the video has over 20 million views on YouTube.

Live performances
Usher, Ella Mai, and Jermaine Dupri performed the song for the first time on BET's SOS: Saving Ourselves - A BET Covid 19 Relief Special, benefiting African American Communities Impacted By Coronavirus on April 22, 2020.

Credits and personnel
Credits adapted from Tidal.

 Usher – vocals, lyrics
 Ella Mai – vocals, lyrics
 Jermaine Dupri – lyrics, production, mixing engineer
 Bryan-Michael Cox – lyrics, production
 Wilbard "VEDO" McCoy III – lyrics
 Christopher Allen Jones – lyrics
 Colin Leonard – mastering engineer
 Bill Zimmerman – assistant engineer
 Phil Tan – mixing engineer

Charts

Certifications

References

2019 songs
2019 singles
Usher (musician) songs
Ella Mai songs
RCA Records singles
Songs written by Usher (musician)
Songs written by Bryan-Michael Cox
Songs written by Jermaine Dupri
Song recordings produced by Jermaine Dupri
Songs written by Ella Mai